The A1 Team Russia is the defunct Russian team of A1 Grand Prix, an international racing series.

Complete A1 Grand Prix results

(key), "spr" indicate a sprint race, "fea" indicate a main race.

References

External links

A1gp.com Official A1 Grand Prix Web Site
Official Team Website - A1 Team Russia

Russia A1 team
Russian auto racing teams
National sports teams of Russia
Auto racing teams established in 2005
Auto racing teams disestablished in 2006